Bizarre ER is a BBC Three, and later E4, television show that deals with hospital mishaps.

Series guide
Every episode shows a miraculous survival story and strange facts, like the woman who fell out of a plane at 35,000 ft and survived. Series 2 began airing on 21 April 2009 and consists of ten 30 minute episodes. Series 1 and 2 were filmed at the Norfolk and Norwich University Hospital.

Following the first five episodes, the show's animal counterpart Bizarre Animal ER, narrated by Kevin Bishop, aired for eight episodes on BBC Three in Bizarre ER's Tuesday slot. Bizarre ER returned after for five more episodes.

Bizarre ER returned for a twelve-part third series from 10 May 2010 and finished on 19 July 2010. The series was filmed at the Northampton General Hospital.

The series returned for a ten-part fourth series on 28 March 2011, now narrated by Sheridan Smith. Filming takes place at Northampton General Hospital as well as Bradford Royal Infirmary. The series also features bizarre operations that have happened around the world.

Series 5 is set in the US with John Barrowman as narrator, it started in March 2013 and ended in May 2013. Series 6 is set at several hospitals across the UK; locations include Dudley, Warwick, Basingstoke and the Isle of Wight.

International broadcast
Bizarre ER is now airing in the U.S. on the Discovery Life channel. In Italy, it is broadcast by DMAX.

Transmissions

Series 1 (2008)

Series 2 (2009)

Series 3 (2010)

Series 4 (2011)

Series 5 (2013)

Series 6 (2017) 

Bizarre Animal ER

References

External links

2000s British documentary television series
2010s British documentary television series
2008 British television series debuts
2017 British television series endings
BBC Television shows
2000s British medical television series
2010s British medical television series
E4 (TV channel) original programming
Television series by All3Media
English-language television shows
Television shows set in England
Television shows set in Norfolk
Television shows set in Northamptonshire